Analogue, Inc. is an American company that designs, develops, and sells video game hardware. Its hardware products include the Analogue Pocket, Analogue Mega Sg, Analogue Super Nt, Analogue Nt mini, and Analogue Nt.

History
Analogue was founded in 2011 by Christopher Taber. Analogue was founded with the philosophy to create products that celebrate and explore the history of video games with the respect it deserves.

Products
Analogue CMVS (introduced 2011)
Analogue Arcade Stick (introduced 2012)
Analogue Nt (introduced 2014)
Analogue Nt mini (introduced 2016)
Analogue Super Nt (introduced 2017)
Analogue Mega Sg (introduced 2018)
Analogue Pocket (introduced 2019)
Analogue Duo (introduced 2020)

Reception

Analogue was awarded "The 10 most innovative consumer electronics companies of 2022" by Fast Company.
The work of Analogue has been received positively for their focus on video game preservation. Analogue has won design awards for their Product Design and Industrial Design from Red Dot, Consumer Electronics Show and Wallpaper (magazine).

References

Video game companies established in 2011
Video game companies of the United States